List of the parishes in Middlesex, grouped by hundred, as of 1831.

The historic county of Middlesex was recorded in the Domesday Book as being divided into the six hundreds of Edmonton, Elthorne, Gore, Hounslow (Isleworth in all later records), Ossulstone and Spelthorne, as follows:

The City of London (i.e., the original ″Square Mile″) was geographically located within Middlesex (and was bounded by the hundred of Ossulstone to the west, north and east) but was essentially independent of the county for most purposes.

References

History of Middlesex
Middlesex